Girls For A Change (GFC) is a US 501(c)3 organization based in San Jose, California, that seeks to empower girls and young women by inviting them to design, lead, fund and implement social change projects that tackle issues girls face in their own neighborhoods. It connects them with adult women trained to serve as volunteer coaches, who become role models and also advocates.

History
Girls For A Change grew out of an initiative launched in Santa Clara County, California in 2000, and was officially founded in 2002 in San Jose, after the founders received initial help and training from Women's Technology Cluster. In 2003 it received a grant from the Draper Richards Foundation, with which it expanded in 2004 to Oakland, Santa Cruz, and East Palo Alto and in 2006 to Phoenix, Arizona. In 2008 there was a national tour of Change Your World training sessions, an online GFC Action Network was launched, and the organization further spread to Richmond, Virginia.  The founding board included Niko Everett (formerly Clifford), the founding CEO, and Whitney Smith, who succeeded her as CEO. In 2013 Smith stepped down and was succeeded by Angela Patton, the organization's program manager in Richmond, Virginia.

Girls For A Change in Richmond, Virginia, was founded in 2007 by African American girls seeking to improve the image of black fathers, and focuses on empowering girls of color.

Activity

Girl Action Teams
In Silicon Valley, Phoenix, and Richmond, Girls For A Change offers free after-school programming for middle- and high-school girls. For a year, Action Teams consisting of 5-30 girls and two adult female coaches identify challenges in their communities and design and implement creative solutions to address them as a team following GFC's 7 Steps of Social Change. The year starts with a Girl Summit at which inspiring women speak  and ends with a Completion Ceremony.

One Action Team led four high schoolers in Silicon Valley to found Girls Helping Girls, a non-profit that seeks to improve girls' education in countries around the globe.

Change Your World trainings 
Starting in 2008, GFC began offering day-long Change Your World conferences at venues including corporate seminars, youth-empowerment conventions, and schools. During the workshop, women and girls are taught the basics of social change and a history of powerful social change makers; girls are encouraged to identify inspirations and role models.

Partnerships
Girls For A change has partnered with companies and organizations including: U By Kotex, Kotex's brand aimed at young women that also seeks to empower women and girls to celebrate their bodies and talk openly about periods and vaginal care—Girls For A Change received $1 for every signer of the "Declaration of Real Talk" on the brand website, Miss Representation, a documentary film and associated non-profit that seeks to explore and offset disparaging images of girls and women and sexual stereotyping in general—Girls For A Change was one of the women-led organizations receiving a share of proceeds from screenings of the film; Sephora; Eileen Fisher—a grant in 2009; the Theta Nu Xi multicultural sorority. Nike; and meSheeky.

References

External links
 Girls For A Change
 Girls For A Change, Richmond, Virginia

Youth organizations based in the United States
Youth empowerment organizations
Women's organizations based in the United States
Women in California